The Moroccan national ice hockey team is the men's national ice hockey team of Morocco. The team is controlled by the Royal Moroccan Ice Hockey Federation and has been an associate member of the International Ice Hockey Federation (IIHF). The team's home rink is in the Moroccan capital, Rabat.

History
In June 2008, Morocco took part in the inaugural Arab Cup in Abu Dhabi, also involving the national teams of Algeria, the UAE and Kuwait. Morocco's first game was a 9-0 loss to the UAE on 16 June 2008. The first ever goal to be scored by a Moroccan player was scored by Yassin Ahrazem against Kuwait during the first ever 2008 Arab Cup. On 22 May 2010, the IIHF announced that Morocco is now an associate member.

Tournament record

Arab Cup

Development Cup

2010 team roster

All-time record against other nations
Last match update: 1 October 2017

See also
Ice hockey in Africa
Algeria national ice hockey team
Namibia national inline hockey team
South Africa men's national ice hockey team
Tunisia national ice hockey team

References

External links
Fédération Royale Marocaine de Hockey sur Glace 
Article in Moroccan press about the team

National ice hockey teams in Africa
National ice hockey teams in the Arab world
Ice hockey